In computer aided engineering (CAE) a preprocessor is a program which provides a graphical user interface (GUI) to define physical properties. 
This data is used by the subsequent computer simulation.

Steps that are followed in Pre-Processing

1> The geometry (physical bounds) of the problem is defined

2> The volume occupied by the fluid is divided into discrete cells (meshing)

3> The physical modeling is defined - E.g. equations of motion + enthalpy + radiation + species conservation

4> Boundary conditions are defined. This involves specifying the fluid behavior and properties at the boundaries of the problem. For transient problems, the initial conditions are also defined.

5> The simulation is started and the equations are solved iteratively as a steady state or transient

6> Finally a post-processor is used for the analysis and visualization of the resting solution

Computer graphics